A halfway house is an institute for people with criminal backgrounds or substance use disorder problems to learn (or relearn) the necessary skills to re-integrate into society and better support and care for themselves. 

As well as serving as a residence, halfway houses provide social, medical, psychiatric, educational, and other similar services. They are termed "halfway houses" due to their being halfway between completely independent living and in-patient or carceral facilities, where residents are highly restricted in their behavior and freedoms. 

The term has been used in the United States since at least the Temperance Movement of the 1840s.

Types
Halfway houses in the US generally fall into one of two models. In one model, upon admission, a patient is classified as to the type of disability, ability to reintegrate into society, and expected time frame for doing so. They may be placed into an open bay same-sex dormitory similar to that found in military basic training, with fifty to one-hundred similar residents in a gymnasium-type setting all going through the same thing at the same time. As the patients become able to increase their skill level and decrease their dependency on support services, the number of dorm members is reduced, to the point where, at the final stage before being able to move into their own apartment, a patient may have only one or two roommates.

Another model reverses this. New patients are admitted in individual rooms providing one-to-one services and programming. As they become more independent, the dorms become bigger so that by the time the patient leaves, they are living in the 50–100-person dorm described above.

The same two models are used for convicted criminals to begin the process of reintegration with society, while still providing monitoring and support; this is generally believed to reduce the risk of recidivism or relapse when compared to a release directly into society. Halfway houses are meant for reintegration of persons who have been recently released from prison or continuous mental institutionalization.

Definitional problems

There are several different types of halfway houses. Some are state sponsored, while others (mainly addiction recovery homes and mental illness homes) are run by "for profit" entities. In criminology the purpose of a halfway house is generally considered to be that of allowing people to begin the process of reintegration with society, while still providing monitoring and support. This type of living arrangement is often believed to reduce the risk of recidivism or relapse when compared to a straight release directly into society.

Some halfway houses are meant solely for reintegration of persons who have been recently released from prison or jail; some are meant for people with chronic mental health disorders; others are for people with substance abuse issues, generally called sober living houses. The state-placement of ex-criminal offenders to a "halfway house" after a prison sentence may either be decided upon as part of the judge's sentence or by a prison official's recommendation. A direct sentence to a halfway house can be decided upon by a judge or prosecutor in lieu of prison time.

National differences

United States
The majority of programs in the United States make a distinction between a halfway house and a sober/recovery house. A halfway house has an active rehabilitation treatment program run throughout the day, where the residents receive intensive individual and group counseling for their substance abuse while they establish a sober support network, secure new employment, and find new housing. Residents stay for one to six months.

Residents of work release housing are frequently required to pay rent on a "sliding scale" which is often dependent on whether or not they can find a job while in residence. In addiction-recovery houses, a resident's stay is sometimes financed by health insurance. In addition, a stay in a recovery house might be a partial requirement of a criminal sentence. Residents are normally asked to remain sober and comply with a recovery program.

In certain areas, a halfway house is much different from a recovery house or sober house. In these areas, a drug and alcohol halfway house is licensed by the Department of Health and has staff coverage 24 hours a day. This staff includes a clinical treatment team.

United Kingdom
In the United Kingdom, "halfway house" can refer to a place where people with mental disorders, victims of child abuse, orphans, or teenage runaways stay. The latter are often run by charities, including the Church of England, other churches, and community groups. Residential places for offenders on bail are known as bail hostels, and probation-supervised accommodation for offenders post-release are known as Approved Premises. However, the expression halfway house more usually refers to something combining features of two other things, for example a solution to a problem based on two ideas.

Canada
In Canada, halfway houses are often called Community-Based Residential Facilities. The Correctional Service of Canada definition of a halfway house is similar to the general American definition of one.

Programming integrity
With regard to programming integrity, findings regarding the ability of transitional housing to reduce recidivism or help addiction recovery have been mixed. Many criminologists have conducted research of halfway house facilities that provide housing for low risk criminals after institutionalization. Risk screening for residents is considered essential in order to preserve both institutional and community safety.

NIMBY effect 
There is often opposition from neighborhoods in which halfway houses attempt to locate. Social justice literature observes the relationships between halfway house siting and the NIMBY (Not In My Back Yard) phenomenon. Some communities/neighborhoods may have the ability to affect political legislation through political solidarity while others may not. Some research stresses that community residents simply feel nervous when halfway houses are sited near them. Others point out that the presence of transitional residences may pose real hazards to community safety. In NIMBY research, it has been suggested that a neighborhood's resistance to placement might be linked to class-based prejudices about ex-offenders and drug addicts.  argue that NIMBY responses are sometimes associated with a distrust for government sponsors.

See also
 Almshouse
 Deinstitutionalisation
 Exodus (transitional housing)
 Hostel
 Poorhouse
 Sober living houses
 Types of drug rehabilitation treatment

Citations

References

Further reading

 
 
 
 

Homelessness
Criminal law
Prisons
Drug rehabilitation